The 1992 Waterford Senior Hurling Championship was the 92nd staging of the Waterford Senior Hurling Championship since its establishment by the Waterford County Board in 1897.

Lismore were the defending champions.

On 15 November 1992, Ballygunner won the championship after a 1-12 to 2-07 defeat of Mount Sion in the final. This was their fourth championship title overall and their first title since 1968.

Results

Group A

Table

Group A results

Group A play-offs

Group B

Table

Group B results

Knock-out stage

Quarter-finals

Semi-finals

Final

References

Waterford Senior Hurling Championship
Waterford Senior Hurling Championship